The Wolf at the Door is a 1986 Danish-French biographical drama film written and directed by Henning Carlsen. It is based on real life events of French artist Paul Gauguin, who was married to a Danish woman and lived in Copenhagen in the 1880s.

It was entered into the main competition at the 43rd Venice International Film Festival.

Cast 
 Donald Sutherland as Paul Gauguin
 Max von Sydow as August Strindberg
 Sofie Gråbøl as Judith Molard
 Jean Yanne as William Molard
 Valeri Glandut as Annah
 Ghita Nørby as Ida Molard
  as Mette Gad
  as Juliette Huet
 Jørgen Reenberg as Eduard Brandes
  as Julien Leclercq
 Yves Barsacq as Edgar Degas

References

External links 
 

1980s biographical drama films
1986 drama films
1986 films
Biographical films about painters
Cultural depictions of August Strindberg
Cultural depictions of Edgar Degas
Cultural depictions of Paul Gauguin
Danish biographical drama films
English-language Danish films
English-language French films
Films directed by Henning Carlsen
French biographical drama films
1980s French films